Elle Janette Mills (born July 17, 1998), also known by her YouTube username ElleOfTheMills, is a Canadian YouTube vlogger. She won the "Breakout YouTuber" category at the 10th Shorty Awards in 2018. Her videos have been compared to the films of John Hughes.

Family and early life 
Mills was born in Manila, Philippines and raised in the Ottawa, Ontario area. She began making home videos when she was eight years old. In high school, she was inspired to become a YouTuber by watching the YouTube videos of Grace Helbig and Casey Neistat.

YouTube career
At the beginning of 2017, she had about 15,000 subscribers on YouTube. Her channel gained subscribers very quickly after her coming-of-age videos went viral later that year. In particular, her November 2017 coming out video, in which she came out as bisexual, pushed her over the million-subscriber mark.

Mills signed with Fullscreen in June 2017, and they produced her first ever tour in the spring of 2018. By the end of 2017, her channel had over 915,000 subscribers, and she surpassed 1 million subscribers in February 2018. That May, she suffered a mental breakdown and posted a video announcing that she would take a break from making new videos. She returned to YouTube a month later. She signed with United Talent Agency in December 2018.

References

Canadian YouTubers
Living people
Filipino emigrants to Canada
LGBT YouTubers
Filipino LGBT comedians
Canadian LGBT comedians
Queer women
Filipino bisexual people
Canadian bisexual people
People from Manila
Women video bloggers
Fullscreen (company) people
1998 births
Canadian women bloggers
21st-century Canadian women
20th-century Canadian LGBT people
21st-century Canadian LGBT people
20th-century Filipino LGBT people
21st-century Filipino LGBT people
YouTube channels launched in 2012